The 2010 Citi BCS National Championship Game was a college football bowl game to determine the national champion of the 2009 NCAA Division I FBS football season, and was played between the Texas Longhorns and the Alabama Crimson Tide.  It was hosted by the Pasadena Tournament of Roses Association at the Rose Bowl Stadium in Pasadena, California, January 7, 2010.  It was the 12th BCS National Championship Game, and the second consecutive year the champion of the Southeastern Conference (SEC) was matched against the champion of the Big 12 Conference. Alabama got the win over Texas, 37-21, to complete a perfect 14-0 season and clinch the school's 13th national championship.

The game was the ninth meeting of Texas and Alabama, though the first since the 1982 Cotton Bowl Classic.  Prior to the game, Texas led the all-time series with a 7–0–1 record, with the first meeting in 1902.

The match-up was the third game in which the Tournament of Roses hosted the BCS National Championship game in Pasadena, and the fifth time, overall, that it has hosted a No. 1 versus No. 2 match-up. However, this was the first time the Tournament of Roses hosted the game as a separate event from the Rose Bowl Game.  They had previously hosted BCS Championship games in the 2006 and 2002 Rose Bowls, and pre-BCS No. 1 versus No. 2 match-ups in the 1969 and 1963 Rose Bowls.

With the win, Alabama became only the third team to complete a 14-0 season (after Ohio State in 2002, and Boise State just three nights earlier in the Fiesta Bowl).

ABC televised the game, as well as the Rose Bowl; Fox televised the remainder of the BCS. The match-up was the final BCS game to air on broadcast television, with cable network ESPN taking over all Bowl Championship Series telecasts starting in 2011. Following the game in June, Citi decided to end the sponsorship of any future Rose Bowl games, including the National Championship game.

Pregame ceremonies
Audra McDonald performed America the Beautiful prior to the teams taking the field, while Flea, Josh Groban performed the Star-Spangled Banner. United States Air Force Academy parachute jumpers, Wings of Blue, dropped in before the National Anthem and 4 F-18 Super Hornets flew over at the conclusion. Keith Jackson, long-time ABC Sports college football play-by-play announcer, performed the coin toss.

Teams
Texas wore its white jerseys and was situated on the east sideline, and Alabama wore its crimson jerseys and used the west bench at the Rose Bowl stadium.

The two programs that played in this game had won a combined eleven poll-era national championships. Texas had won four, most recently in  2005, and Alabama had won seven, most recently in 1992. Texas had participated in three previous BCS Bowl games and was only one of two teams who were undefeated and had played in at least three BCS Bowls. Alabama had played in two previous BCS Bowl games, 2009 Sugar Bowl and 2000 Orange Bowl losing both.

Texas was leading the all-time series with Alabama by a 7–0–1 count (2–0 in Austin, 2–0 in Dallas, 1–0 in Miami, 1–0 in New Orleans, 1–0 in Tuscaloosa, 0–0–1 in Houston).

Following this appearance by Texas, the next Big 12 team to reach a national championship game was the 2022 TCU Horned Frogs, in the 2023 edition of the championship.

Game summary

Alabama won the coin toss and elected to receive the kickoff.  The Longhorns forced a three-and-out. Alabama attempted a fake punt, but P.J. Fitzgerald was intercepted by Blake Gideon at the Alabama 36. Texas drove to the Alabama 11, but on 1st down, Colt McCoy (2008 Heisman trophy runner-up and 2009 Heisman Trophy finalist) was hit on QB option run by sophomore defensive lineman Marcell Dareus, pinching a nerve in McCoy's throwing shoulder and leaving him unable to throw the ball accurately. McCoy was replaced by true freshman Garrett Gilbert and would be ruled out for the remainder of the game. Texas reached the 1-yard line, but was held to an 18-yard field goal for an early 3–0 lead. Julio Jones muffed the following kick-off (a surprise short one), with Texas recovering at the Alabama 30. Texas was unable to get a first down, but chalked up a 42-yard field goal, giving Texas a 6–0 lead.

On the other hand, Alabama started working their offense. Alabama's offensive line was able to create holes in the Texas defense.  Behind Alabama's offensive line, Alabama running back Mark Ingram II (2009 Heisman trophy winner) moved almost at will against a Texas defense.  The power offense resulted in Alabama taking a lead it would never relinquish on the first play of the second quarter.  Mark Ingram II scampered into the end zone for a touchdown behind the block of 360-pound defensive lineman Terrence Cody, who was routinely used by Alabama as a blocker when Alabama was close to the goal-line. This touchdown would give Alabama a lead it would not relinquish for the rest of the game.

Alabama took control of the game midway through the second quarter and Alabama's offensive line allowed freshman running back Trent Richardson to shoot straight down the middle of the field for a 48-yard touchdown run.  The PAT made the game 14–6 in favor of the Crimson Tide. McElroy was sacked four times by the Texas defense in the first half, but with Ingram II and Richardson both gaining yards steadily on the ground, Alabama rarely needed to pass.

The last few minutes of the first half were dominated by the Alabama defense.  Javier Arenas intercepted Gilbert to end one drive and Alabama's Leigh Tiffin added a field goal off the interception.  After the ensuing kickoff, Dareus intercepted Gilbert with 12 seconds left in the half on a bobbled "shovel pass" and the 300-pounder returned the interception for a touchdown, with the point after giving Alabama a commanding 24–6 lead going into halftime.

In the second half, the Texas combination of Gilbert and Shipley, and a Longhorns defense that shut down Alabama in the second half cut the Crimson Tide's lead to 24-21 with six minutes to play in the game. However, the Crimson Tide's first sack (by Eryk Anders) led to a fumble recovery by Courtney Upshaw at the Texas three-yard line that tipped the momentum back to the Crimson Tide. After the recovery, Alabama's Mark Ingram II added his second touchdown of the night and enabled Saban's team to extend its lead to 31–21.  Alabama's defense intercepted Gilbert twice in the ensuing drives and the Crimson Tide's offense added another touchdown from Trent Richardson for a final score of 37–21 (Tiffin's extra point attempt was no good). After the ensuing kickoff, Texas tried to mount a comeback drive, but Gilbert threw an errant pass that was deflected off of two Texas players and ultimately intercepted by Alabama FS Tyrone King, effectively sealing the win and the national championship for the Crimson Tide.

Alabama Head Coach Nick Saban won his second BCS Championship, the only coach to do so with two different programs.  Alabama also became the third team in Division I FBS history to finish a season 14–0, after Ohio State in 2002 and Boise State who did it in the Fiesta Bowl three nights earlier.

Pivotal plays

Besides McCoy being taken out of the game, the two most pivotal plays of the game came at the ends of the halves.  With 15 seconds to go until halftime and Alabama leading 17–6, Texas quarterback Garrett Gilbert tossed a shovel pass into a crowd of Texas and Alabama linemen which bounced off the hands of Texas running back D. J. Monroe.  Alabama defensive lineman Marcell Dareus, the same player who had knocked McCoy out of the game, gathered it in and powered 28 yards for a touchdown to give Alabama a 24–6 lead at halftime.

The other pivotal play was late in the fourth quarter.  Texas had closed the Alabama lead to 24–21 on the strength of two touchdown passes caught by senior wide receiver Jordan Shipley and a No. 2 ranked defense that had held Alabama scoreless in the second half. Texas had the ball deep in their own side of the field with 3:04 left to play. Alabama defender Eryk Anders made his team's first sack, tackling Gilbert hard enough to force a fumble, which was recovered by Courtney Upshaw at the Texas three-yard line.  On the following drive, with 2:01 to go in the 4th quarter, Alabama's Mark Ingram II scored a touchdown to extend the Crimson Tide's lead to 31–21.

On the second play of Texas' next possession, Alabama defensive back Javier Arenas grabbed his sixth interception of the season, electing to down the ball rather than return it.  Alabama's true freshman running back, Trent Richardson, gained 27 yards in three plays to score, building Alabama's lead to 37–21 with 47 seconds to play after a missed extra point attempt.

Texas' final drive also ended with an interception which bounced off of several players before ending up in the grasp of Alabama reserve defensive back Tyrone King, a senior who saw little playing time in his career.  Alabama QB Greg McElroy would take a knee to drain the last 0:36 off the clock, handing Alabama its first BCS championship, eighth national title since 1960, and first ever win over Texas.

Coming into the game, Texas had the top rated rushing defense in college football.  However, Alabama's Heisman Trophy winner Mark Ingram II rushed 22 times for 116 yards and two touchdowns, while back-up running back true freshman Trent Richardson contributed an additional 109 yards and two touchdowns on 19 carries. Alabama quarterback Greg McElroy was 6-for-11 for 58 yards and no touchdowns, taking five sacks in the process. It was later revealed that McElroy was playing with broken ribs. Texas' freshman quarterback, Garrett Gilbert, passed for 186 yards and two touchdowns, but also lost a fumble and threw four interceptions, two of which bounced off Texas receivers.

Scoring summary

Statistics

References

2009–10 NCAA football bowl games
2010
2010
2010
Sports competitions in Pasadena, California
American football competitions in California
BCS National Championship Game
BCS National Championship Game
21st century in Pasadena, California